The 1979 AIAW (Association for Intercollegiate Athletics for Women) National Large College Basketball Championship was held on March 16–25, 1979. Sixteen teams were invited, and Old Dominion University was crowned national champion at the conclusion of the tournament.

The host site for the Final Four was Greensboro, North Carolina.

Opening rounds

East Regional – The Bronx, NY

Central Regional – Carbondale, IL

South Regional – Cookeville, TN

West Regional – Stanford, CA

Final Four – Greensboro, NC

See also
 1979 AIAW National Small College Basketball Championship

References

AIAW women's basketball tournament
AIAW
AIAW National Division I Basketball Championship
1979 in sports in North Carolina
Women's sports in North Carolina